Seatek Spa is an Italian manufacturer of marine diesel engines, primarily used in racing and leisure craft.

History
Carlo Bonomi founded Seatek in 1986 after a career in offshore racing. Bonomi's first six-cylinder engine won a number of races including the world offshore class 1 in 1988 and 1989.

Products

 6-4V-9 six cylinder engine
 12 4V 21 twelve cylinder engine

References

External links

Marine engine manufacturers
Engine manufacturers of Italy
Diesel engine manufacturers
Companies established in 1986
Companies based in Lombardy